This is a list of governors of the Venezuelan Táchira State:

Until 1989 they were appointed by the President of Venezuela. Starting from that year they are elected in universal, direct and secret elections.

Elected governors

See also

 List of Governors of States of Venezuela
 Politics of Venezuela
 History of Venezuela

References 

 Cuadro Comparativo Gobernadores Electos por Entidad Elecciones 1989-1992-1995-1998-2000.
 CNE: Elecciones Regionales del 2004.
 CNE: Elecciones Regionales del 2008
 CNE: Elecciones Regionales del 2012
 CNE: Elecciones Regionales del 2017
 Venezuela vote dispute escalates foreign sanctions threat (2017)

Táchira
Táchira